Uncivil War Birds is a 1946 short subject directed by Jules White starring American slapstick comedy team The Three Stooges (Moe Howard, Larry Fine and Curly Howard). It is the 90th entry in the series released by Columbia Pictures starring the comedians, who released 190 shorts for the studio between 1934 and 1959.

Plot
It is the American Civil War, and the Stooges enlist in the service. Moe and Larry accidentally join the Union Army, while Curly manages to correctly sign up with the Confederacy. Before the error can be corrected, several Union soldiers order Moe and Larry to lock up their "prisoner." A few moments later, a Confederate general sees Curly being released and, upon seeing Moe and Larry, thinks he has captured two Union soldiers. This mix up goes back and forth several times, until Moe and Larry finally find Confederate uniforms, only to be caught in Union army headquarters. They eventually escape by performing minstrel song-and-dance routine in blackface, with Curly playing a Mammy-type character and Larry strumming a banjo. At the end the Stooges marry their brides who after the first kiss start beating the Stooges Up!

Cast

Credited
Moe Howard as Moe
Larry Fine as Larry
Curly Howard as Curly

Uncredited
Eleanor Counts as Ringa Belle
Faye Williams as Mary Belle
Marilyn Johnson as Lulu Belle
Maury Dexter as Southern gentleman
Victor Travers as Justice of the Peace

Union army
Theodore Lorch as Union Colonel
John Tyrrell as Union Sergeant
Robert B. Williams as Union Lieutenant
Blackie Whiteford as Union officer
Al Rosen as Union officer
Bobby Burns as Union soldier
Joe Palma as Union soldier
Cy Schindell as Union soldier
Al Morino as Union soldier
Harold Breen as Union soldier
Jack Cooper as Union soldier

Confederate army
Brian O'Hara as Confederate officer
Lew Davis as Confederate soldier with ants
Johnny Kascier as Confederate soldier with ants
Heinie Conklin as Confederate soldier
Bobby Burns as Confederate soldier

Production notes
Uncivil War Birds was filmed on August 24–28, 1945. It is a remake of the 1939 Buster Keaton short Mooching Through Georgia; the stock shot of the union lieutenant on horseback with his battalion of eight was borrowed from that film. The song "Dixie" replaces the Stooges' regular opening theme of "Three Blind Mice" for this film, and continues as background music for approximately twenty seconds into the opening scene.

This short would mark the final appearances of long-time Stooge regulars Lew Davis and John Tyrrell, who died in 1948 and 1949, respectively.

Curly's illness
The film was produced after Curly Howard suffered a mild stroke. As a result, his performance was marred by slurred speech, and slower timing, though Curly was more energetic and displayed better timing than in previous shorts. In addition, Moe Howard and Larry Fine are paired together and given the lion's share of the film's dialogue.

References

External links 
 
 

1946 films
1946 comedy films
The Three Stooges films
American black-and-white films
American Civil War films
Films directed by Jules White
Columbia Pictures short films
American comedy short films
1940s English-language films
1940s American films